The Birmingham School of Art was a municipal art school based in the centre of Birmingham, England. Although the organisation was absorbed by Birmingham Polytechnic in 1971 and is now part of Birmingham City University's Faculty of Arts, Design and Media, its Grade I listed building on Margaret Street remains the home of the university's Department of Fine Art and is still commonly referred to by its original title.

History
The origins of the School of Art lie with the Royal Birmingham Society of Artists, who founded the Birmingham Government School of Design in 1843. George Wallis (1811–1891), Wolverhampton-born artist and art educator, was its Headmaster in 1852–1858.

In 1877, the Town Council was persuaded by the school's energetic headmaster Edward R. Taylor to take the school over and expand it to form the United Kingdom's first municipal college of art. With funding coming from Sir Richard and George Tangye, the current building was commissioned from architect J H Chamberlain.

In 1885, the school became the first Municipal School of Art. It later becomes the leading centre for the Arts and Crafts Movement.

An associated School of Architecture was formed in 1909 and received recognition by the Royal Institute of British Architects in 1923. By the 1960s, the School had outgrown the original Margaret Street building and expanded into the campus of the University of Aston in Gosta Green.

In 1971, with the founding of Birmingham Polytechnic, the School of Art lost its independence and became the Polytechnic's Faculty of Art and Design. In 1988, this in turn absorbed the former Bournville College of Art to form the Birmingham Institute of Art and Design, the largest centre for education in art, design and the media in the United Kingdom outside London. Birmingham Polytechnic gained university status in 1992 as the University of Central England, which was renamed Birmingham City University in 2007.

Building

The building cost £21,254, and was sponsored by donations from the Tangye brothers (£10,937) and Louisa Ryland (£10,000). The site was given from the Newhall estate by William Barwick Cregoe Colmore.

It is a red-brick Victorian Gothic structure, completed after its architect J. H. Chamberlain's death by his partner William Martin and his son Frederick Martin, and widely considered as Chamberlain's masterpiece. Its Venetian style and naturalistic decoration are heavily influenced by John Ruskin's Stones of Venice. The foundation stone was laid on 31 May 1884 and the building was opened in September 1885.

An extension from the north end, running east along Cornwall Street was added by Martin & Chamberlain in 1892–93.

A continuous plinth band of Doultons tilework containing lozenges lilies and sunflowers on blue backgrounds runs around the building. The original iron railings were made by Hart & Co..

In 1992, the cleaning of the exterior was completed after two years and the refurbishment and renovation of the interior began in 1993, ending in 1996. The work was undertaken by Associated Architects following completion of the Birmingham School of Jewellery also for Birmingham City University.

Alumni

 Helen Allingham, watercolour painter
 Norah Ansell, sculptor
 Evelin Winifred Aston, sculptor
 Eileen Blake, painter
 Kate Bunce, painter
 Rose Connor, architect
 Harry Eccleston, painter, etcher, banknote designer
 Ian Emes, animator and film director
 Rowland Emett, cartoonist and constructor of whimsical kinetic sculpture
 Elizabeth Bertha Fraser, sculptor 
 David Hardy, astronomical artist
 Evelyn Holden, illustrator and artist
 George Edward Hunt, jeweller
 Marjorie Incledon, painter, stained glass designer
 Celia Levetus, author, poet and illustrator
 Dorothy Lockwood, painter, illustrator
 Ronald Pennell, artist, engraver and sculptor
 Fay Pomerance, painter
 David Prentice, painter
 Constance Smedley, founder of women's clubs
 Rosemary Stjernstedt, architect
 Howard Taylor, painter, sculptor
 David Tremlett, artist
 John Walker, painter

Archives 
The School of Art Archive is now held at Birmingham City University. The University of Birmingham's Cadbury Research Library holds material related to the Arts and Crafts movement that occurred in the school, when it was sometimes referred to as the Birmingham College of Arts and Crafts. Both collections include examples of the influence of Leonard Jay, who taught at the school and had a significant impact on mid-20th century printing.

References

External links

Birmingham Institute of Art and Design website
Looking at Buildings – Pevsner Architectural Guides

 
1843 establishments in England
Educational institutions established in 1843
School of Art
Art schools in England
Grade I listed buildings in the West Midlands (county)
Grade I listed educational buildings
Culture in Birmingham, West Midlands
Grade I listed buildings in Birmingham